The list of ship decommissionings in 1882 includes a chronological list of all ships decommissioned in 1882.


References 

 navsource.org

See also 

1882
 Ship decommissionings